The Duino Mithraeum is a Mithraeum located near Duino, in the province of Trieste, north-eastern Italy. Mithraea were places of worship for the followers of the Roman mystery religion known as the Mithraic Mysteries. Unlike most other Mithraea, the Duino Mithraeum is a natural cave.

Overview
The Duino cave is located about two kilometers from the sources of Timavo river. At the center of the cave there are two benches and a square block of limestone that served as an altar during religious ceremonies. The lower wall has a plaque on two columns depicting the tauroctony, a standard iconic feature of the Mithraic Mysteries. 400 coins, oil lamps and a large number of jars were found in the cave.

Gallery

See also 
 San Giovanni in Tuba

External links 
 Soprintendenza Archeologia, belle arti e paesaggio, information and opening time - http://www.sabap.fvg.beniculturali.it/aree-archeologiche/aree-archeologiche-della-provincia-di-trieste

Mithraea
Caves of Italy
Landforms of Friuli-Venezia Giulia
Province of Trieste
Temples in Italy
Roman sites of Friuli-Venezia Giulia